Néstor Azón (born 11 November 1937) is an Ecuadorian footballer. He played in four matches for the Ecuador national football team in 1963. He was also part of Ecuador's squad for the 1963 South American Championship.

References

1937 births
Living people
Ecuadorian footballers
Ecuador international footballers
Association football midfielders
C.D. Everest footballers
People from El Oro Province